Victoria Anderson (born ) is a Canadian actress. She is known for her television roles, such as Dr. London Blake on the TeenNick/YTV series Open Heart, Queen Titania on the Nickelodeon series The Other Kingdom, and Evie on The CW series No Tomorrow. Since 2021, she has portrayed Kate Whistler on the CBS series NCIS: Hawaiʻi.

Life and career
Anderson is from Edmonton, Alberta, and graduated from Frances Kelsey Secondary School in Mill Bay, British Columbia. She has a fine-arts degree from York University, and graduated magna cum laude in acting in 2011.

In 2014 Anderson was cast in the 2015 YTV/TeenNick series Open Heart where she played the role of Dr. London Blake, the older sister of the lead character. She also played PR expert Drew on the web series MsLabelled. In 2016 Anderson had a recurring role on the Nickelodeon series The Other Kingdom, playing the Fairy Queen Titania, the lead character's mother.

Anderson starred as Evie in The CW series No Tomorrow which was ordered to series in May 2016 and premiered in October. In 2017 she began playing the recurring role of Blake Crawford on the NBC television series Blindspot. In June 2021, Anderson was cast in the regular role of Kate Whistler in the CBS drama series NCIS: Hawai'i.

Filmography

References

External links

 

1980s births
Living people
21st-century Canadian actresses
Actresses from Edmonton
Canadian child actresses
Canadian film actresses
Canadian television actresses